Intelligent information society is a hypothetical social transformation based around communication technology infrastructure and artificial intelligence. In the Fourth Industrial Revolution, the convergence of artificial intelligence, robot technology, big data and software disrupts fields such as labor, welfare, employment, education and defense. In the intelligent information society, data, knowledge and information will supplant traditional production factors (labor and capital) and spark revolutionary change across society. The economy will move from a material economy to a service economy and then to a shared economy, with decentralized, or horizontal power structures, and thus greater freedoms. These freedoms will depend on an invigorated civil society to prevent government and/or other concentrated power to dominate.

Examples 

 AI home appliances solve housework.
Autonomous vehicles increase mobility and safely .
AI healthcare predicts the onset of disease.

Soft Power 
An intelligent information society is a society where humans and things are connected through intelligence. The economy moves from a material economy to a service economy and then to a shared economy. Governance changes from vertical hierarchical order.

Joseph Nye proposed the concept of soft power, which is the ability to attract and co-opt, rather than coerce (contrast hard power). Soft power is more important than hard power in the intelligent information society. South Korea has been promoting hard power-oriented national strategies and economic growth. Nye argued that the proliferation of knowledge and networks in information shifted the center of power from hard to soft. Rather than coercion, restraint, and rewards, they dominate the other person's mind and persuade them. The intelligent information society forms the inflection point as the world shifts from hard power to soft power.

Economy 
The economy of the intelligent information society relies on the digital economy. The Internet of Things (IoT), is a driving force for economic growth, discovering more creative, lower cost and innovative services. IoT creates value through collaboration between industries. It creates added value by applying IoT to fields such as automotive, medical, energy and power. Companies change from selling products to subscription services. 

Social production is a way of producing a product or service through a voluntary, open and horizontal collaboration. It uses a mixture of the capitalist market and sharing economy. Goods such as cars, homes, furniture, and clothing are shared through social media, unions, and redistribution clubs. Transaction costs for sharing products, services, and the content decline, enabling efficient use. 

Jeremy Rifkin claims that social capital is as important as financial capital, that access replaces ownership, and that cooperation replaces competition..

Platform society 
The platform underlying the Industrial Revolution was factories. What can be seen as a fourth revolution is centered on an intelligent computing platform. The Internet of Things, Artificial intelligence, and virtual reality are realizations of such advancements.

Intelligence is shrinking economies of scale, and small-scale services and products become practical. This can contribute to quality of life via personalized services that reflect the individual consumer's situation.

Heterarchical democracy is a consensual system in which states, citizens, and markets share power. Big data is its foundation.

Big data is the foundation for citizens to become 'informed citizens' by providing them with unlimited information. Thus, citizens with big data-based information become pro-users who are both producers and suppliers of policies as well as users and operators of policies. It is to enable sharing to be realized.

Future 
Care must be taken to ensure that the new form of democracy on which big data is based, is not a "big data brother" in which big data is used to enable autocratic power. Checks and balances complemented by open civil society participation can prevent government or other concentrated power to dominate. 

Korean society from the 1960s to the early 1980s was represented by industrialization, followed by a period focused on improving the social quality of life. The intelligent information society takes this as a central task.

Governments, industry and civil society should cooperatively define how the society is to operate.

References 
* Intelligent Information Society Promotion Team, Ministry of Science, ICT and Future Planning (Medium- and Long-term Comprehensive Measures for Intelligent Information Society): http://www.msip.go.kr

Information society